Branchiostegus is a genus of marine ray-finned fishes, tilefishes belonging to the family Malacanthidae. They are found in the eastern Atlantic Ocean through the Indian Ocean to the western Pacific Ocean. Here they create burrows in soft substrates in the comparatively deep waters of the continental shelf and slope.

Characteristics
Branchiostegus tilefishes have a rectangular body shape with a square profile to the head. They have a raised seam situated to the anterior of the dorsal fin, this can be reduced but it is always there. They have a body which is around four times as long as it is deep. There are fine serrations on the preopercular upper arm while its lower arm has very few or no serrations and there is no spine at its angle. The operculum has a single flexible, blunt spine. The mouth is slightly angled and extend to the front of the eye. The dorsal and anal fins are long and unbroken. The dorsal fin has 6 to 8 spines, typically 7 and 14 to 16, normally 15, soft rays. The anal fin contains 2 spines and 11 to 13, typically 12, soft rays. The caudal fin is rounded,
truncate, or double emarginate and sometimes has elongated tips. They have pelagic larvae which have many spines on their heads and serrated ridges.

Species
There are currently 18 recognized species in this genus:
 Branchiostegus albus Dooley, 1978
 Branchiostegus argentatus (G. Cuvier, 1830)
 Branchiostegus auratus (Kishinouye, 1907)
 Branchiostegus australiensis Dooley & Kailola, 1988 (Australian tilefish)
 Branchiostegus biendong Hiramatsu, Vinh, Endo, 2019
 Branchiostegus doliatus (G. Cuvier, 1830) (Ribbed tilefish)
 Branchiostegus gloerfelti Dooley & Kailola, 1988
 Branchiostegus hedlandensis Dooley & Kailola, 1988 (Port Hedland tilefish)
 Branchiostegus ilocanus Herre, 1928
 Branchiostegus japonicus (Houttuyn, 1782) (Horsehead tilefish)
 Branchiostegus okinawensis Hiramatsu & Yoshino, 2012
 Branchiostegus paxtoni Dooley & Kailola, 1988 (Paxton's tilefish)
 Branchiostegus saitoi Dooley & Iwatsuki, 2012
 Branchiostegus sawakinensis Amirthalingam, 1969 (Freckled tilefish)
 Branchiostegus semifasciatus (Norman, 1931) (Zebra tilefish)
 Branchiostegus serratus Dooley & Paxton, 1975 (Australian barred tilefish)
 Branchiostegus vittatus Herre, 1926
 Branchiostegus wardi Whitley, 1932 (Ward's tilefish)

Systematics
Branchiostegus was created by the French naturalist Constantine Samuel Rafinesque (1783-1840) in 1815, with Lacépède's Coryphaenoides hottuynii (now recognised as a synonym of Branchiostegus japonicus) as its type species. The genus name  is a compound of branchios meaning "gill" and stegos meaning "cover". Rafinesque put this name forward without explanation but he placed the genus in a subfamily of Lophionota, an unavailable name for a grouping which approximates to the currently recognised Coryphaenidae, in which he put dolphinfishes, sailfishes and many other marine fishes and which were distinguished by the possession of branchiostegal membranes. The genus is currently placed in the subfamily Latilinae.

References

Malacanthidae
Marine fish genera
Taxa named by Constantine Samuel Rafinesque